"Come Back" is a single released by Welsh pop singer Jessica Garlick which was the  entry for 2002 Eurovision Song Contest.

Background

Composition
The song was written by Martyn Baylay then an airline pilot from Birmingham who prior to "Come Back" had made seven unsuccessful attempts to place a composition in the UK national preselection round for Eurovision, also known as A Song for Europe. Baylay would recall: "I had always tried to deliberately write a song for the Contest, I would try anything to get in, I studied form so to speak and tried to create the perfect contest song. None of this was successful, so when I thought I don't care about formula any more, I sent in 'Come Back' and it won." The demo of "Come Back" submitted to the BBC to consider for A Song for Europe featured vocalist Bernie Nolan.

A Song for Europe
After "Come Back" had been selected as one of the eight Song for Europe 2002 finalists, the BBC's Eurovision executive producer Kevin Bishop contacted the station's Music & Media Partnership managing director Rick Blaskey who'd recall Bishop advising him that "Come Back" "was written by a pilot from Birmingham who doesn't know anyone in the business and needs some help". Blaskey said of "Come Back": "my favourite song in the competition, so the next day I met the writer and contacted [Atomic Kitten producers] Bill Padley and Jeremy Godfrey. They said exactly what I said, that this was a potential winner." Blaskey had the idea of having a Pop Idol contestant perform the song and on learning that Jessica Garlick had stated a longtime ambition to compete at Eurovision she was recruited: Garlick would recall: It... all happened so quickly, I got the phone call on Monday [January 21, 2002] and recorded the song on Wednesday." "Come Back" was announced as the UK entrant for Eurovision 2002 following the March 3 television broadcast of A Song for Europe 2002 on March 3, 2002, Garlick's performance of the song having solicited 68,000 televotes—40,000 more than second place.

At Eurovision 2002

Performance
On the night of the Eurovision competition, held on 25 May 2002 at the Saku Suurhall Arena in Tallinn, Estonia, "Come Back" was performed second, following ' One with "Gimme" and preceding 's Manuel Ortega with "Say a Word". For her Eurovision appearance, Garlick wore a dark red gown which was shredded from the waist down. She was accompanied on stage by five backing singers dressed in white.

Results
"Come Back" is often cited as having finished third at Eurovision 2002, although in the contest's official rankings "Runaway" is assigned third place and "Come Back" fourth, the preference for "Runaway" being due to its two first place votes (from Latvia and ) while "Come Back" received only one first place vote (from Austria).

Whether considered a third or fourth-place finisher, "Come Back" remains the highest ranked UK entrant at Eurovision since the #2 finish of "Where Are You?" by Imaani in 1998, "Come Back" being the first UK entrant to score a Top Ten finish at Eurovision since "Where Are You?". (The UK entrant for Eurovision 2009: "It's My Time" by Jade Ewen would considerably best "Come Back"'s point total with a tally of 173 points: despite earning the most points for any UK entrant since the 227 points earned by "Love Shine a Light" by Katrina and the Waves afforded the last-named number a landslide Eurovision 1997 victory, "It's My Time"'s point tally only resulted in a #5 placing at Eurovision 2009.) The UK resurgence at Eurovision would be short-lived as at Eurovision 2003 the UK entry "Cry Baby" by Jemini would finish last with zero points.

Charts
"Come Back" debuted at the No. 13 on the UK Singles Chart dated 25 May 2002: its strong showing on the 25 May night of competition for Eurovision 2002 failed to buoy the popularity of the track which dropped out of the Top 30 over the next three weeks, overall spending a total of six weeks in the chart.

References

2002 songs
Eurovision songs of 2002
Eurovision songs of the United Kingdom